July Creek is a creek which is located in the Boundary Country region of British Columbia.  The creek is west of Grand Forks and flows into the Kettle River.  It was discovered around 1860.  The creek was panned for gold.

References

External links
 

Rivers of British Columbia